Längentalspeicher is a lake in Tyrol, Austria.

Lakes of Tyrol (state)